Beaumont Unified School District is located in the central part of Riverside County in California. The district services the city of Beaumont, California and the unincorporated area of Cherry Valley.

History 

The first public school classes in Beaumont started in 1884, the year the town was founded. The first school house was built the following year in the Olivewood neighborhood. In 1909, a second school was built in the Cherry Valley neighborhood. The first high school classes were also in 1909, but the first high school building wasn't completed until 1911.
  
The schools in the area were later unified as the San Gorgonio Unified School District. The Beaumont Unified School District came into existence in 2004 when the previous district (Banning and Beaumont Unified School District) split apart.

Schools 
Today there are sixteen active schools in the Beaumont Unified School District:
Elementary schools
 Anna M. House Elementary
 Brookside Elementary
 Palm Innovation Academy
 Star Light Elementary 
 Sundance Elementary
 Three Rings Ranch Elementary
 Tournament Hills Elementary
 
Middle & high schools
 Mountain View Middle
 San Gorgonio Middle
 Beaumont Senior High
 Glen View High (Continuation)
 Beaumont Middle College High School

Other Beaumont school sites
21st Century Learning Institute
Beaumont Adult School
Beaumont USD Preschool
Highland Academy Charter School
Summerwind Trails K-8

References

External links
 

2004 establishments in California
School districts established in 2004
School districts in Riverside County, California